Louis D. Burgee (December 19, 1890 – January 1, 1966) was an American Negro league outfielder between 1917 and 1921.

A native of Philadelphia, Pennsylvania, Burgee made his Negro leagues debut in 1917 for the Hilldale Club, and played for Hilldale again in 1921. He died in Philadelphia in 1966 at age 75.

References

External links
  and Seamheads

1890 births
1966 deaths
Hilldale Club players
Baseball outfielders
Sportspeople from Philadelphia
20th-century African-American sportspeople